Lambruschini is an Italian surname. Notable people with the surname include:

Alessandro Lambruschini (born 1965), Italian long-distance runner
Armando Lambruschini (1924–2004), Argentine Navy admiral
Luigi Lambruschini (1776–1854), Italian cardinal
Raffaello Lambruschini (1788-1763) Italian author, pedagogist, and agronomist,

Italian-language surnames